Kaja Grobelna (born January 4, 1995, in Radom) is a Belgian volleyball player of Polish origin, playing as an opposite spiker.

She played for the Belgium women's national volleyball team, at the 2017 FIVB Volleyball World Grand Prix.
Since the 2018/2019 season, she has played for Unet E-Work Busto Arsizio.

Sporting achievements

Clubs 
Belgian Super Cup:
  2012, 2014
Belgium Championship:
  2014, 2015
  2013
Belgian Cup:
  2014, 2015
German Championship:
  2016
Polish Championship:
  2017
  2018
Polish Super Cup:
  2017
Polish Cup:
  2018

National team 
European League:
  2013

References 

1995 births
Living people
Belgian women's volleyball players
Polish emigrants to Belgium
People from Radom
Volleyball players at the 2015 European Games
European Games competitors for Belgium
21st-century Belgian women